Merlino is a comune (municipality) in the Province of Lodi in the Italian region Lombardy, located about  east of Milan and about  north of Lodi.

Merlino borders the following municipalities: Rivolta d'Adda, Settala, Comazzo, Paullo, Zelo Buon Persico, Spino d'Adda.

Demographic evolution

References

Cities and towns in Lombardy